Adâncata is a commune located in Suceava County, Western Moldavia, northeastern Romania. It is composed of three villages, namely: Adâncata, Călugăreni, and Fetești.

Politics and local administration

Communal council 

The commune's current local council has the following political composition, according to the results of the 2020 Romanian local elections:

Gallery

References 

Communes in Suceava County
Localities in Western Moldavia